North Benton may refer to;

Places
United States
North Benton, Minnesota, an unincorporated community
North Benton, Ohio, an unincorporated community